The No Filter Tour was a European/North American concert tour by the Rolling Stones which began on 9 September 2017 in Hamburg, Germany. The tour was scheduled to conclude in 2020 but had to be postponed due to the COVID-19 pandemic. The tour resumed in September 2021. A few weeks after that announcement, the Stones announced that drummer Charlie Watts underwent an unspecified medical procedure and that he would likely be unable to join the tour due to a lengthy recovery. Watts ultimately died on 24 August 2021. The band announced on 5 August that longtime Stones associate Steve Jordan would fill in as drummer for the 2021 dates.

Overview  

The No Filter Tour was announced on 9 May 2017, with fourteen shows in twelve different venues across Europe in September and October of the same year. On 26 February 2018, fourteen new dates were added throughout Europe and the UK. The Stones logo was redesigned for the European leg by French designer Millinsky. With an overall attendance of 1,506,259 fans grossing $237.8 million, the tour was one of the most commercially successful concert tours of 2017 and 2018. The North American leg of the tour was officially announced on 19 November 2018 and was set to play 17 shows across the United States and one in Canada, beginning on 20 April 2019 in Miami, Florida.

On 30 March 2019, it was announced that Mick Jagger would be receiving treatment for an unspecific medical condition, which forced the Stones to postpone the 17-date North American leg of the tour. The procedure took place in April 2019 at a New York City hospital. As a result, the band's headline performance at the New Orleans Jazz Festival had to be cancelled. It was initially announced that Fleetwood Mac would headline in place of the Stones, but they were also forced to cancel due to Stevie Nicks contracting influenza. The slot was filled by Widespread Panic.

On 4 April 2019, it was announced that Jagger's procedure was successful. On 16 May, the Rolling Stones announced that No Filter Tour would resume on 21 June with the 17 postponed dates rescheduled up to the end of August.

On 6 February 2020, fifteen additional North American dates were announced.

On 17 March 2020, the fifteen North American dates for May–July 2020 were postponed due to the coronavirus pandemic. The tour was rescheduled and resumed in September 2021, without Charlie Watts who had to undergo a medical procedure and died before the final leg of the tour. The band confirmed on 26 August that the tour will continue as planned. Steve Jordan will take his place in the lineup for the remainder of the tour.

Stage design 

The stage was designed by Stufish Entertainment Architects and built by Stageco and WIcreations. The stage consists of four LED video columns measuring 22 metres (72 ft) tall and 11 metres (36 ft) wide. Two metres (6.5 ft) below the top of the LED screens is an 8-metre (26.2 ft) wide gap to accommodate a row of nine moving spotlights with a transparent rain cover. A transparent roof structure covers the main stage to offer protection from weather. The main stage measures 60 metres (196.9 ft) wide. In 2017 and 2018, there was a 28-metre-long (26.2 ft) T-shaped catwalk and B-stage.  For the 2019 leg of the tour, the B-stage was changed to a round design and the far ends of the main stage were extended into the crowd.

Set list
These setlists were performed at the 19 October 2017 concert held at the U Arena, Nanterre, the 22 May 2018 concert at London Stadium, London, and at the 5 August 2019 concert at MetLife Stadium, East Rutherford. These do not represent all shows throughout the tour.

Tour dates

Personnel

The Rolling Stones
Mick Jagger – lead vocals, guitar, harmonica, percussion
Keith Richards – guitars, backing vocals
Ronnie Wood – guitars
Charlie Watts – drums (through 2019)

Additional musicians
Darryl Jones – bass
Steve Jordan – drums (2021, replacing Charlie Watts)
Chuck Leavell – musical director, keyboards, backing vocals
Sasha Allen – backing vocals
Karl Denson – saxophone
Tim Ries – saxophone, keyboards
Matt Clifford – keyboards, percussion, French horn, show introduction voice
Bernard Fowler – backing vocals, percussion

See also
The Rolling Stones concerts

Notes

References

External links
The Rolling Stones (Official site)
Setlist on Spotify

The Rolling Stones concert tours
2017 concert tours
2018 concert tours
2019 concert tours
2021 concert tours
Concert tours postponed due to the COVID-19 pandemic